The Forgotten Children of Congo is a 2007 British documentary film written, produced and directed by Alex Tweddle for Angry Man Pictures Ltd.

Background
The Forgotten Children of Congo was filmed over four weeks in the Democratic Republic of Congo. From the remoteness of the Congo Basin, to the capital Kinshasa and the volatile Ituri Province in the East, this documentary focuses on the plight of the country's street children.

References

External links
 http://www.britfilms.com/britishfilms/catalogue/browse/?id=836F1B320c8cf188CEoOu1A3B54A
 http://www.variant.randomstate.org/Doc5/CCA4-fri-forgottenchildrenofthecongo.htm
 http://www.frontlineclub.com/club_videoevents.php?event=820

2007 films
British documentary films
2000s French-language films
Lingala-language films
Swahili-language films
Documentary films about street children
Documentary films about the Democratic Republic of the Congo
2000s British films